SFX may refer to:

Entertainment
 Special effects (usually visual), illusions used in film, television, and entertainment
 Sound effects, sounds that are artificially created or enhanced
 SFX (magazine), a British magazine covering the topics of science fiction and fantasy
 SFX (Science Fiction Expo), a convention in Toronto, Canada
 SFX Entertainment, American promoter
 S-F-X (album), a 1984 album by Haruomi Hosono
 SFX, a prototype Super NES video game console
 Super FX, a coprocessor chip used in some Super NES video game cartridges
 Use in comics of onomatopoeic, conventions to convey sound events accompanying visuals and dialogue

Computing
 Self-extracting archive, a compressed file with an embedded executable to decompress itself
 SFX (software), an OpenURL link server
 SFX (PSU), a design for a small form factor (SFF) power supply casing
 Small form factor (desktop and motherboard), a term covering smaller-than traditional form factors for computer components
 Spread Firefox, a web-browser promotion
 SquirrelFish Extreme, a JavaScript engine for WebKit; see SquirrelFish Extreme

Other
 Audio signal processing, effects
 Ilford SFX, a photographic film
 Serial Femtosecond Crystallography, X-ray free-electron laser-based laboratory technique

See also 
 FX (disambiguation)
 St. Francis Xavier (disambiguation)
 Small form factor (disambiguation)